Herbert Alton Meyer (August 30, 1886 – October 2, 1950) was a U.S. Representative from Kansas.

Born in Chillicothe, Ohio, Meyer attended the grade schools, Washington, D.C., the Staunton Military Academy, Staunton, Virginia from 1900 to 1904, the George Washington University, Washington, D.C. from 1905 to 1908, and was graduated from National University Law School, Washington, D.C., in 1910. He was admitted to the bar in 1910.

During the First World War served as a captain in the United States Army Air Service. He served as assistant to the Secretary of the Interior 1915-1917. He was an executive of an oil marketing company from 1919 to 1937. In 1940 became publisher of the Independence Daily Reporter.

Death
Meyer was elected as a Republican to the Eightieth and Eighty-first Congresses and had won renomination for a third term. He served from January 3, 1947, until his death from a heart attack at the Bethesda Naval Hospital in Bethesda, Maryland, October 2, 1950. He was interred in Mount Hope Cemetery, Independence, Kansas.

See also
 List of United States Congress members who died in office (1950–99)

References

 Memorial services held in the House of Representatives together with remarks presented in eulogy of Herbert Alton Meyer, late a representative from Kansas

1886 births
1950 deaths
20th-century American businesspeople
United States Army Air Forces officers
People from Independence, Kansas
Republican Party members of the United States House of Representatives from Kansas
George Washington University alumni
George Washington University Law School alumni
20th-century American politicians